The Old Jewish Cemetery on the Oberstrasse is a Jewish cemetery in Hanover. Located on a hill in the city's Nordstadt district, it is the oldest extant Jewish cemetery in Northern Germany. The cemetery contains about 700 graves and was in use from circa 1550 until 1864.

References

External links
 

Hannover
Buildings and structures in Hanover